Senator Pugh may refer to:

Members of the United States Senate
George E. Pugh (1822–1876), U.S. Senator from Ohio from 1855 to 1861
James L. Pugh (1820–1907), U.S. Senator from Alabama from 1880 to 1897

United States state senate members
Adam Pugh (born 1977), Oklahoma State Senate
Catherine Pugh (born 1950), Maryland State Senate
Samuel Johnson Pugh (1850–1922), Kentucky State Senate